Final Rock is an isolated rock standing  south of Mount Feldkotter at the southern extremity of the Neptune Range, Pensacola Mountains, Antarctica. It was mapped by the United States Geological Survey from surveys and U.S. Navy air photos, 1956–66, and so named by the Advisory Committee on Antarctic Names because it is the southernmost rock of the Neptune Range.

References 

Rock formations of Queen Elizabeth Land